Pasorapa Municipality is the second municipal section of the Narciso Campero Province in the Cochabamba Department, Bolivia. Its seat is Pasorapa.

Cantons 
The municipality consists of only one canton, Pasorapa Canton. It is identical to the municipality.

References 

 Instituto Nacional de Estadistica de Bolivia

External links 
 Population data and map of Pasorapa Municipality

Municipalities of the Cochabamba Department